Golden Boy (German: Goldjunge) is a 1925 German silent film directed by H. Klynmann and starring Grete Reinwald and Carl Auen.

The film's sets were designed by the art director Robert A. Dietrich.

Cast
 Henkie Klein as Bolleken 
 Grete Reinwald as Fräulein von Rohden 
 Carl Auen as Arzt 
 Karl Harbacher as Droschkenkutscher 
 Johanna Ewald as Drehorgeljule 
 Josef Commer as Leierkastenmann 
 Maria Grünke as Vorsteherin im Fürsorgeamt 
 Marga Marfels as Gesellschafterin 
 Gret Alexander as Zofe 
 Michael Scharf as Förster

References

Bibliography
 Bock, Hans-Michael & Bergfelder, Tim. The Concise CineGraph. Encyclopedia of German Cinema. Berghahn Books, 2009.

External links

1925 films
Films of the Weimar Republic
German silent feature films
German black-and-white films
1920s German films